William Adalberto Osorio Rivera (born April 13, 1971) is a retired Salvadoran footballer.

He was assistant coach at CD FAS, assisting technical director William Renderos.

Club career
After coming through at Coca-Cola, for whom he made his debut in 1987 while in the Salvadoran second division, Osorio started his top level career with FAS and made his debut in August 1990 against Fuerte San Francisco. He won 6 league titles with FAS in two periods divided by a spell at Luis Ángel Firpo with whom he also won the league in 1998. He was a long time captain of FAS and after leaving FAS in the summer of 2005, he also played professionally for Isidro Metapán and Chalatenango of the Primera División de Fútbol de El Salvador.

International career
Osorio made his debut for El Salvador in an April 1991 UNCAF Nations Cup qualification match against Nicaragua and has earned a total of 67 caps, scoring no goals. Osorio has been a national team stalwart for over 10 years and has represented his country in 18 FIFA World Cup qualification matches over three campaigns and played at the 1991, 1993, 1995, 1997, 1999 and 2001 UNCAF Nations Cups, as well as at the 1996 and 2002 CONCACAF Gold Cups.

His final international game was a January 2002 CONCACAF Gold Cup match against the United States.

Personal life
Osorio is married and has two sons.

Honours
Primera División de Fútbol de El Salvador: 7
 1995, 1996, 1998, 2002 Clausura, 2002 Apertura, 2004 Apertura, 2005 Clausura

References

External links

Profile - CD FAS 
¿Qué PASó con... William Osorio ? - El Salvador.com 

1971 births
Living people
Sportspeople from San Salvador
Association football defenders
Salvadoran footballers
El Salvador international footballers
1996 CONCACAF Gold Cup players
2001 UNCAF Nations Cup players
2002 CONCACAF Gold Cup players
C.D. FAS footballers
C.D. Luis Ángel Firpo footballers
A.D. Isidro Metapán footballers
C.D. Chalatenango footballers
C.D. FAS managers
Salvadoran football managers